Victoria Yuryevna Zhilinskayte (born 6 March 1989) is a Russian handball player for HC Kuban Krasnodar and the Russian national handball team.

At the 2009 World Women's Handball Championship she reached the final and won the gold medal with the Russian team, defeating France. She competed at the 2011 World Women's Handball Championship in Brazil, where the Russian team placed 6th.

She is of Lithuanian descent. Her twin sister, Yana Zhilinskayte, is also a handball player.

References

External links

1989 births
Living people
Handball players at the 2012 Summer Olympics
Handball players at the 2016 Summer Olympics
Medalists at the 2016 Summer Olympics
Olympic gold medalists for Russia
Olympic handball players of Russia
Olympic medalists in handball
Russian female handball players
Russian people of Lithuanian descent